The Power Agent is a 2020 comedy short film written and directed by Mark Atkinson. The film stars Atkinson, Jeff Krapf and Charlie Krapf.

Plot 
An actor seeks advice from his agent.

Cast 

 Mark Atkinson
 Jeff Krapf
 Charlie Krapf

Production 
Atkinson is the film's writer, director, producer and star. It is a coming of age short film made in San Diego.

Release 

The film screened at Oceanside International Film Festival, San Diego International Film Festival, SENE Film Festival, Block Island Film Festival and Borrego Springs Film Festival. In 2021, it was distributed by San Diego International Airport's Film Program.

Reception

Critical response

Alan Ng at Film Threat scored it 7.5 out of 10 saying "it gets right to the point" and that it's "funny and squeezes all the cuteness it can get out of young Charlie Krapf’s cinematic debut."

Accolades

References

External links 

 
 

2020 short films
2020 comedy films
American coming-of-age comedy films
2020s coming-of-age comedy films
Films set in San Diego
Films shot in San Diego
Films about actors
American parody films
2020s parody films
2020s English-language films
2020s American films
American comedy short films